Ivana Kindl (born 18 January 1978) is a Croatian singer.

Career
In 2010, she was awarded the Porin for best album in the spiritual music category. The same year she won the best female singer award from the editors of Croatian Radio stations. In 2011, she won the Porin for best female vocal performance.

The song "Sve istine i laži" was released as a single on 6 October 2017.

Discography

Albums
 Trenutak istine (2002)
 Moj svijet (2004)
 Osjećaj (2006)
 Gospel u Komediji (2008)
 Promjenjiva (2010)

Singles

References

External links
 

1978 births
People from Požega, Croatia
Living people
21st-century Croatian women singers
Croatian pop singers